Windham High School is the name of several high schools in the United States:

 Windham High School (Connecticut) in Windham, Connecticut
 Windham High School (Maine) in Windham, Maine
 Windham High School (Ohio) in Windham, Ohio
 Windham High School (New Hampshire) in Windham, New Hampshire